Kenneth John Button (11 October 1922, Rochester, New York – 30 August 2010, Indialantic, Florida) was a solid-state and plasma physicist. He was the editor-in-chief of the International Journal of Infrared and Millimeter Waves from its inception in 1980 until his resignation in 2004.

Education and career
After four years in the U.S. Army Infantry during World War II, Button attended the University of Rochester, where he received his bachelor's degree and then his M.S. in physics in 1952.
He joined in 1951 MIT's Lincoln Laboratory, where he did research, often in collaboration with Benjamin Lax, on semiconductors by studying their energy band structure using cyclotron resonance. Research on germanium and silicon done at the Lincoln Laboratory played an essential role in the development of semiconductor devices.

Button was in 1974 the program chairman of the first conference on "Submillimeter Waves and Their Applications". He was the founder, and general chairman for many years, of the annual conference called the "International Conference on Infrared and Millimeter Waves" (and now called the "International Conference on Infrared, Millimeter, and Terahertz Waves"). In his honor, the Kenneth J. Button Prize is awarded annually.

Selected publications
 with Benjamin Lax and Laura M. Roth: 
with Solomon Zwerdling, Benjamin Lax, and Laura M. Roth: 
with S. Zwerdling, B. Lax, and L. M. Roth: 
with S. Zwerdling and B. Lax: 
with Benjamin Lax: 
with B. Lax and C. C. Bradley: 
with Clifton G. Fonstad and Wolfgang Dreybrodt: 
with Michael von Ortenberg, G. Landwehr, and D. Fischer: 
with Zbigniew Drozdowicz, Paul Woskoboinikow, Kiyokazu Isobe, Daniel R. Cohn, Richard J. Temkin, and Jerry Waldman: 
with Stephen M. Wolfe: 
with Mohammed Nurul Afsar: 

with M. N. Afsar:

As editor
 (This is the 1st in a series of 16 books.)

References

American physicists
1922 births
2010 deaths
University of Rochester alumni
MIT Lincoln Laboratory people
Fellows of the American Physical Society
Fellow Members of the IEEE
People from Indialantic, Florida
United States Army personnel of World War II